Abd El-Latif El-Doumany (born 14 February 1977) is an Egyptian football player who played for Zamalek SC for most of his football career; He also played for Ghazl El-Mahalla and Haras El-Hodood.

Honours 

Zamalek SC
 Egyptian Premier League: 2000–01, 2002–03
 Egypt Cup: 1999–00, 2001–02
 Egyptian Super Cup: 2001, 2002
 African Cup Winners' Cup: 2000

External links
 
 

1977 births
Living people
Egyptian footballers
Egypt international footballers
Zamalek SC players
Haras El Hodoud SC players
Egyptian Premier League players
Association football forwards
People from Dakahlia Governorate